Abdul Motaleb Khan Pathan is a Jatiya Samajtantrik Dal politician and the former Member of Parliament of Mymensingh-14.

Career
Pathan was elected to parliament from Mymensingh-14 as a Jatiya Samajtantrik Dal candidate in 1979.

References

Jatiya Samajtantrik Dal politicians
Living people
2nd Jatiya Sangsad members
Year of birth missing (living people)